Highway City may refer to:
 Highway City, California, unincorporated community
 Highway City, Fresno, California, community incorporated into Fresno